Like We Care is an MTV news program in the early 1990s, debuting in Spring 1992, that was geared towards high school students.

Through research using focus groups MTV found that a narrator reading the news turned the youngsters off, so the programme was voiced by people of a similar age to the target audience. Similarly, the show was presented using slang that would make viewers more comfortable, and topics were of interest to teenagers.

The theme song was performed by Pop's Cool Love.

References

MTV original programming
1992 American television series debuts
1992 American television series endings